Praesepe  is a British bingo, arcade gaming and gambling company formed in 2007 based in Milton Keynes. It owns the high street gambling arcade chain Cashino.

Praesepe was founded in October 2007 by Nick Harding and the private equity firm Marwyn Partners.

In autumn 2012, Praesepe became a subsidiary of Gauselmann, the German gaming and gambling company founded by Paul Gauselmann.

References

British companies established in 2007
Companies based in Milton Keynes
Online gambling companies of the United Kingdom
2012 mergers and acquisitions